Kembhavi  is a town in the southern state of Karnataka, India. It is located in the Shorapur taluk of Yadgir district in Karnataka. There is an old well having octoganal shape. One tomb with single stone.

Demographics
 India census, Kembhavi had a population of 13077 with 6679 males and 6398 females.

See also
 Yadgir
 Districts of Karnataka

References

External links
 Built Up Area    : 205745.78 Sq.Ft.

 Cities and towns in Yadgir district